The Medicine Bow River is a  tributary of the North Platte River, in southern Wyoming in the United States.

Description
It rises in the Snowy Range, flowing out of the North Gap Lake, in southeastern Carbon County. It flows north, past Elk Mountain, then northeast, then northwest past the town of Medicine Bow and between the Shirley Mountains to the north and the Medicine Bow Mountains to the south. Near the town of Medicine Bow the Medicine Bow River is joined by its two largest tributaries, Rock Creek and the Little Medicine Bow River. It joins the North Platte in the Seminoe Reservoir, with the lower  of the river forming an arm of the reservoir.

Discharge statistics

See also

 List of Wyoming rivers

References

External links

 

Rivers of Wyoming
Tributaries of the North Platte River
Rivers of Carbon County, Wyoming